The UMBC Retrievers men's soccer team represents the University of Maryland, Baltimore County in National Collegiate Athletic Association (NCAA) college soccer competition. UMBC competes as a member of the America East Conference.

History 
UMBC created its soccer team in 1968, three years after the founding of the university.

The team's home field, Retriever Soccer Park was completed in the fall of 1998. The stadium center includes a 120-yard by 70-yard field equipped with Bermuda grass.

The Retriever's winnings include: the 1999 NEC Regular Season, the 1999 Northeast Conference Men's Soccer Tournament, the America East Tournament in 2010, 2012, and 2013, 2014 and the America East Regular Season in 2003, 2013 and 2014. Additionally, the men's soccer team advanced to the first round of the 1999 NCAA Division I Men's Soccer Championship, the second round of the NCAA Tournament in 2010, 2012, 2013, and the College Cup Final Four in 2014.
2014 Men's Final Four
Coach Pete Caringi selected NSCAA National Coach of the Year

Coaches

 Pete Caringi, Jr., Head Coach
 Anthony Adams, Associate Head Coach
 Phil Saunders, Goalkeeper Coach
 Pete Caringi III,  Assistant Coach
 Seamus Ertel, Video Coordinator

Current roster 
The current roster for the season is as follows:

Seasons

{| class="wikitable" style="font-size: 90%"
!rowspan="2"|Year
!rowspan="2"|League
!rowspan="2"|Conference
!colspan="4"|Regular Season
!rowspan="2"|Postseason Results
!rowspan="2"|Head Coach
|-
!Finish
!Wins
!Losses
!Ties
|-
!align="center"|2000
|align="center"|Division 1
|align="center"|NEC
|align="center"|?
|align="center"|15
|align="center"|5
|align="center"|0
|align="center"|NEC Finalist
|Pete Caringi, Jr.
|-
!align="center"|2001
|align="center"|Division 1
|align="center"|NEC
|align="center"|?
|align="center"|9
|align="center"|6
|align="center"|2
|align="center"|NEC Semifinalist
|Pete Caringi, Jr.
|-
!align="center"|2002
|align="center"|Division 1
|align="center"|NEC
|align="center"|?
|align="center"|11
|align="center"|6
|align="center"|3
|align="center"|NEC Semifinalist
|Pete Caringi, Jr.
|-
!align="center"|2003
|align="center"|Division 1
|align="center"|America East
|align="center"|1st
|align="center"|10
|align="center"|3
|align="center"|5
|align="center"|America East Semifinalist
|Pete Caringi, Jr.

|-
!align="center"|2004
|align="center"|Division 1
|align="center"|America East
|align="center"|2nd
|align="center"|8
|align="center"|6
|align="center"|3
|align="center"|Did Not Qualify
|Pete Caringi, Jr.
|-
!align="center"|2005
|align="center"|Division 1
|align="center"|America East
|align="center"|2nd
|align="center"|9
|align="center"|7
|align="center"|3
|align="center"|America East Semifinalist
|Pete Caringi, Jr.
|-
!align="center"|2006
|align="center"|Division 1
|align="center"|America East
|align="center"|7th
|align="center"|5
|align="center"|9
|align="center"|3
|align="center"|Did Not Qualify
|Pete Caringi, Jr.
|-
!align="center"|2007
|align="center"|Division 1
|align="center"|America East
|align="center"|5th
|align="center"|8
|align="center"|7
|align="center"|5
|align="center"|America East Quarterfinalist
|Pete Caringi, Jr.
|-
!align="center"|2008
|align="center"|Division 1
|align="center"|America East
|align="center"|9th
|align="center"|6
|align="center"|9
|align="center"|2
|align="center"|Did Not Qualify
|Pete Caringi, Jr.
|-
!align="center"|2009
|align="center"|Division 1
|align="center"|America East
|align="center"|5th
|align="center"|14
|align="center"|6
|align="center"|0
|align="center"|America East Finalist 
|Pete Caringi, Jr.
|-
!align="center"|2010
|align="center"|Division 1
|align="center"|America East
|align="center"|2nd
|align="center"|12
|align="center"|4
|align="center"|4
|align="center"|America East Champions  NCAA Second Round
|Pete Caringi, Jr.
|-
!align="center"|2011
|align="center"|Division 1
|align="center"|America East
|align="center"|4th
|align="center"|7
|align="center"|8
|align="center"|3
|align="center"|America East Quarterfinalist
|Pete Caringi, Jr.
|-
!align="center"|2012
|align="center"|Division 1
|align="center"|America East
|align="center"|2nd
|align="center"|11
|align="center"|4
|align="center"|7
|align="center"|America East Champions  NCAA Second Round
|Pete Caringi, Jr.
|-
!align="center"|2013
|align="center"|Division 1
|align="center"|America East
|align="center"|1st
|align="center"|16
|align="center"|1
|align="center"|3
|align="center"|America East Champions  NCAA Second Round
|Pete Caringi, Jr.
|-
!align="center"|2014
|align="center"|Division 1
|align="center"|America East
|align="center"|1st
|align="center"|14
|align="center"|6
|align="center"|5
|align="center"|America East Champions  NCAA Final Four
|Pete Caringi, Jr.
|-
!align="center"|2015
|align="center"|Division 1
|align="center"|America East
|align="center"|3rd
|align="center"|11
|align="center"|6
|align="center"|3
|align="center"|America East Semifinalist
|Pete Caringi, Jr.
|-
!align="center"|2016
|align="center"|Division 1
|align="center"|America East
|align="center"|8th
|align="center"|5
|align="center"|9
|align="center"|3
|align="center"|Did Not Qualify
|Pete Caringi, Jr.
|-
!align="center"|2017
|align="center"|Division 1
|align="center"|America East
|align="center"|5th
|align="center"|7
|align="center"|6
|align="center"|5
|align="center"|America East Quarterfinalist
|Pete Caringi, Jr.
|-
!align="center"|2018
|align="center"|Division 1
|align="center"|America East
|align="center"|5th
|align="center"|10
|align="center"|6
|align="center"|4
|align="center"|America East Finalist
|Pete Caringi, Jr.
|-
!align="center"|2019
|align="center"|Division 1
|align="center"|America East
|align="center"|7th
|align="center"|6
|align="center"|9
|align="center"|1
|align="center"|Did Not Qualify
|Pete Caringi, Jr.
|-
!align="center"|2020
|align="center"|COVID-19 Season Moved to Spring 2021
|-
!align="center"|2021 Spring
|align="center"|Division 1
|align="center"|America East
|align="center"|5th
|align="center"|3
|align="center"|4
|align="center"|1
|align="center"|Did Not Qualify
|Pete Caringi, Jr.
|-
!align="center"|2021
|align="center"|Division 1
|align="center"|America East
|align="center"|5th
|align="center"|8
|align="center"|8
|align="center"|3
|align="center"|America East Semifinalist
|Pete Caringi, Jr.

Professional players
Jon Bell, Drafted MLS, San Jose Earthquakes
Billy Heavner, undrafted signee of Minnesota United
 Andrew Bulls Drafted MLS Columbus Crew
 Kadeem Dacres USL  Arizona, Louisville, Drafted MLS Chicago Fire
 David Feazell
 Kevin Gnatiko
 Levi Houapeu MLS Philadelphia,USL Rochester, Baltimore Blast
 Derek Phillips
 Brian Rowland
 Matt Watson       Chicago Fire, MLS
 Steve Zerhusen NASL Ft. Lauderdale Strikers
 Pete Caringi III    Drafted MLS, Montreal Impact, USL Oklahoma City 
 Phil Saunders       Iceland, Baltimore Blast
 Jordan Becker USL, Rochester Rhinos, Baltimore Blast
 Mamadou Kansaye     USL, North Carolina
 Marquez Fernandez   NASL  Tampa Bay Rowdies
 Oumar Ballo         MLS  Houston Dynamo
 Milo Kapor          Spain 3rd Division
 Guiliano Celenza    Baltimore Blast
 PJ Wakefield        Baltimore Blast 
 Andrew Wells        Baltimore Blast 
 Billy Nelson        Baltimore Blast
Jason Dieter         Baltimore Blast
 Kay Banjo           Drafted MLS Vancouver
Rick Versteeg        1st Division Holland

References

External links
 

 
Soccer clubs in Baltimore
Soccer clubs in Maryland
1968 establishments in Maryland
Association football clubs established in 1968